The 1982 National Rowing Championships was the 11th edition of the National Championships, held from 17–18 July 1982 at the National Water Sports Centre in Holme Pierrepont, Nottingham.

Senior

Medal summary

Lightweight

Medal summary

Junior

Medal summary 

Key

References 

British Rowing Championships
British Rowing Championships
British Rowing Championships